"Fanny (Be Tender with My Love)" is a song written and performed by the Bee Gees for their Main Course album in 1975. It was the third single release from the album, peaking at number 12 on the United States Billboard Hot 100 chart and number two in Canada. According to Maurice Gibb, producer Quincy Jones called "Fanny" one of his favorite R&B songs of all time.

Inspiration and recording
It was written by Barry Gibb, Robin Gibb and Maurice Gibb. In a 2001 Billboard magazine interview with the Bee Gees, Barry claimed that:

"We had a housecleaner named Fanny when we stayed at 461 Ocean Blvd. [in North Miami Beach] during the making of Main Course. We were sitting in the lounge at Criteria [Studios] writing the song with the lyric idea, 'Be tender with my love'. Maurice turned round and saw Fanny and said, 'Wouldn't it be a better song if it was a woman's name in there, and you're asking her to be tender?".

Recording for "Fanny" took place on 30 January, the same day as "Jive Talkin'", "Songbird", and "All This Making Love". Additional recording took place in February when Barry Gibb began to use his falsetto as a lead vocal in addition to Robin using his falsetto as well sharing the lead on "Fanny" and on backing vocals. The result of this song repeats on the idea of contrasting slower section of "Nights on Broadway". The complexity of falsetto and natural harmonies would become a Bee Gees trademark culminating with 1979's Spirits Having Flown. The key of this song in the end, was from keyboardist Blue Weaver. Weaver was influenced by Hall & Oates' 1973 LP Abandoned Luncheonette as he later admits, "The key change in 'Fanny (Be Tender)' was a complete rip-off from Abandoned Luncheonette from 'She's Gone' [also produced by Mardin], I only had it on tape, and I didn't know that Arif produced it".

Critical reception
Cash Box called it a "soulful composition" that "appears to be the third monster single in a row for these pop masters" off the Main Course album. Record World said that "the Brothers Gibb return to their old heavenly harmony sound."

The group did not perform "Fanny" live because of the layers of harmonies used to create the studio recording. A promotional film was made for distribution, the place was in the same as "Jive Talkin'".

In an interview for Billboard magazine on 14 November 2001, Maurice Gibb claims: "We all love that one, but it's just a bitch to sing". Bruce Eder of Allmusic describes "Fanny" along with "Baby As You Turn Away" had the same exquisitely sung sense of romantic drama as "Lonely Days" and "How Can You Mend a Broken Heart".

Chart performance

Weekly charts

Year-end charts

References

External links
 Lyrics of this song
 

1975 songs
1976 singles
Bee Gees songs
Songs written by Barry Gibb
Songs written by Maurice Gibb
Songs written by Robin Gibb
RSO Records singles
Song recordings produced by Arif Mardin
British soft rock songs
Pop ballads
Soul ballads